Bishop Franciszek "Francis" Hodur (1 April 1866 – 16 February 1953) was the founder and first Prime Bishop of the Polish National Catholic Church (PNCC). Ordained by the Roman Catholic church in 1893, Hodur served two parishes in the Scranton diocese before he was excommunicated five years later in 1898 for his release of a National Church program, which called for reformation to canon laws of temporal goods. His excommunication was also a result of his rejection of the dogmas of papal infallibility and supremacy after the Council of Trent. With a congregation of approximately 200 families, he founded the St. Stanislaus Parish in Scranton and celebrated Mass in the Polish vernacular of the congregation, instead of Latin, as was common in the Roman Catholic church. Hodur was consecrated a bishop in 1907 with apostolic succession by the bishops of Old Catholic Church and went on to expand the episcopate of the PNCC to manage diocesan affairs and ordain priests therein. Under Hodur, the church expanded to 245 parishes across the United States and Poland. After his death in 1953, he was succeeded by Leon Growchowski, whom he had consecrated in 1924.

Early life and Priesthood 
Hodur was born on Easter Sunday, April 1, 1866, to Jan and Maria Hodur in the village of Żarki, 35 miles from Kraków, Poland. He enrolled as a seminarian in Kraków and studied at Jagiellonian University. He left Europe in December 1892 for the United States of America, where he hoped to serve Polish immigrants. Hodur made his way to the Diocese of Scranton, Pennsylvania, and was sent to the seminary at St. Vincent's Benedictine Archabbey in Latrobe. On August 19, 1893, he was ordained a priest in the Roman Catholic Church by Bishop William O'Hara.

Break with Rome 

When issues of contention arose between Polish Catholic immigrants in Scranton, Nanticoke, Wilkes-Barre, Plymouth, Duryea, and Dickson City, and their Irish-American bishop Michael Hoban, Hodur traveled to Rome in January 1898 to seek redress from the Holy See but was unsuccessful, being excommunicated by Pope Leo XIII. Returning to the United States, he met with the parishioners that he had represented and made known his decision not to remain under the jurisdiction of the Roman Catholic Church.

Episcopate 
Hodur was consecrated a bishop on September 29, 1907, by Gerardus Gul, the Old Catholic Archbishop of Utrecht, the Netherlands, assisted by Bishop Jan Van Thiel of Haarlem and Bishop Peter Spitz of Deventer. He then served as the first Prime Bishop of the Polish National Catholic Church and consecrated other bishops, ensuring the maintenance of apostolic succession.

He died in Scranton. His funeral was attended by the Presiding Bishop of the Episcopal Church,  Charles L. Street, suffragan Bishop of the Diocese of Chicago, and Bishop Frederick J. Warnecke of the Diocese of Bethlehem, along with other prominent Episcopal Church leaders. He was succeeded as Prime Bishop by Leon Grochowski.

References 

1866 births
1953 deaths
American bishops
American Old Catholics
Jagiellonian University alumni
People excommunicated by the Catholic Church
People from Chrzanów County
Polish emigrants to the United States
Polish Old Catholics
Prime Bishops of the Polish National Catholic Church